Irene Stella Rolph Langdale (1880 – April 14, 1976) was an English and Canadian artist. She was commonly referred to as Stella Langdale.

The daughter of Marmaduke Albert Langdale and Emma Jane Rolf, she was born in Staines-upon-Thames, Middlesex. She studied at the school of art in Brighton and then pursued further studies at the Glasgow School of Art with Maurice Greiffenhagen and Francis Henry Newbery. She sketched using charcoal and used oils, watercolour, pastels and etching techniques especially aquatint in her work. She also produced sculptures. Her preferred subject matter was landscapes from North Africa, Italy and France, as well as imaginary images often with musical inspiration. She exhibited at the major British galleries and the Paris Salon. She also exhibited with the Royal Scottish Academy, the Royal Glasgow Institute of the Fine Arts, the Senefelder Club and the International Society of Sculptors, Painters and Gravers.

She worked as a book illustrator for almost 25 years with publishers John Lane and Dodd, Mead & Co. Works that she illustrated include:
 Symphonie Symbolique by Edmund John
 The Dream of Gerontius by John Henry Newman
 Christ in Hades by Stephen Phillips
 The Hound of Heaven by Francis Thompson

Langdale came to Victoria in 1940. In 1946, she held an exhibit of works from British Columbia and a few from Europe at the Little Centre in Victoria, a precursor to the Art Gallery of Greater Victoria. She suffered from arthritis and moved to Santa Barbara, California around 1950.

Langdale died in Santa Barbara at the age of 95.

References

External links 
 

1880 births
1976 deaths
English women artists
Canadian women artists
English illustrators
British emigrants to Canada